Petr Haničinec (15 September 1930 in Pardubice – 7 November 2007 in Bratronice) was a Czech actor. He starred in the film Poslední propadne peklu under director Ludvík Ráža in 1982.

Life
Petr Haničinec was born in 1930 and he attended the conservatory after facing poor support from his family. His first wife was Štěpánka Haničincová who became an iconic children's TV presenter whilst he went into the theatre. Haničincová died as a result of alcohol. He then married Marie Kyselková. He was to have two more wives.

He starred in the film Poslední propadne peklu under director Ludvík Ráža in 1982.

Partial filmography

Against All (1956)
Proti vsem (1957) - Ondrej z Hvozdna
Tam na konecne (1957)
Tenkrát o vánocích (1958) - Podporucík jílek
Sedmý kontinent (1960) - Karel Kolafa
Na lane (1963) - Rudolf - Kája's brother
The Treasure of a Byzantine Merchant (1967) - Fábera - driver
Objízdka (1968) - Julius (voice)
Cerný vlk (1972) - nadporucík Tomícek
Kronika zhavého léta (1973) - Jirí Bagár
Horká zima (1974) - Karl
Pavlínka (1974) - tkadlec Holan
Televize v Bublicích aneb Bublice v televizi (1974) - predseda JZD
Smrt mouchy (1977) - Sláma
Stín létajícího ptácka (1977) - vedoucí stavební komise Vojta Sochor
Reknem si to prístí léto (1978) - Cyril
Kam nikdo nesmi (1979) - Capt. Gregor
Svítalo celou noc (1980) - Bláha
Poslední propadne peklu (1982) - Bartos
Zachvev strachu (1984) - Antos (voice)
Horký podzim s vuní manga (1984) - Hrouzek
Cesta kolem mé hlavy (1984) - psychiatrist MUDr. Viceník
Salar (1986) - Narrator
Osudy dobrého vojáka Svejka (1986) - Josef Svejk (voice)
Cas sluhu (1989) - Stach, zástupce reditele
Lady Macbeth von Mzensk (1992) - Boris
Zdislava z Lemberka (1994)

References

Czech male television actors
Czech male film actors
Czech male stage actors
People from Pardubice
1930 births
2007 deaths
20th-century Czech male actors
Academy of Performing Arts in Prague alumni
Czech male voice actors